John Wiedhofft Gough (23 February 1900 - 1976) was a Welsh historian noted for his study of John Locke's political philosophy.

Life and career

Gough matriculated at Merton College, Oxford in 1918.

Gough was described as an outstanding student whilst at Oxford, achieving a first in both the classics and modern history, in 1922 and 1923, respectively. He was a Lecturer at the University of Bristol between 1923 and 1931, and during this time spent a year as Visiting Lecturer at Western Reserve University, Ohio. In 1932 he was made a Fellow of Oriel College, Oxford, and in 1947 was appointed lecturer in modern history. He was awarded a DLitt in 1965.

Gough was twice married: firstly in 1926 to Margaret Christian, née Rintoul, with whom he had a son and two daughters; following Margaret's death in 1939, he remarried in 1941, to Margaret Johnston, née Maclagan.

Works
The Mines of Mendip (1930)
The Superlative Prodigall, a life of Thomas Bushell (1932)
The Social Contract: A Critical Study of its Development (Oxford University Press, 1936; 2nd ed., 1957).
John Locke's Political Philosophy: Eight Studies (Oxford University Press, 1950; 2nd ed., 1973).
Fundamental Law in English Constitutional History (1955)

Notes

1900 births
1976 deaths
20th-century Welsh historians
Fellows of Oriel College, Oxford
Alumni of Merton College, Oxford